The 2019 Illinois State Redbirds baseball team represented Illinois State University during the 2019 NCAA Division I baseball season. The Redbirds played their home games at Duffy Bass Field as a member of the Missouri Valley Conference. They were led by head coach Steve Holm, in his 1st season at Illinois State.

Previous season
The 2018 Illinois State Redbirds baseball team notched a 22–28 (9–12) regular season record and finished tied for sixth in the MVC Conference standings. The Redbirds reached the 2018 Missouri Valley Conference baseball tournament, where they were defeated by Bradley and Dallas Baptist. Illinois State did not receive an at-large bid to the 2018 NCAA Division I baseball tournament.

Personnel

Coaching staff

Roster

Schedule and results

! style=";color:white;" | Regular Season (32–22)
|- valign="top" 

|- bgcolor="#bbffbb"
| February 15 || 3:30 pm ||  || at * ||  || E. S. Rose Park • Nashville, TN || W27–1111 || Gilmore(1–0) || Bowen(0–1) || – || 208 || 1–0 || – || StatsStory
|- bgcolor="#bbffbb"
| February 16 || 1:00 pm ||  || at Belmont* ||  || E. S. Rose Park • Nashville, TN || W14–3 || Lindgren(1–0) || Brennan(0–1) || – || 100 || 2–0 || – || StatsStory
|- bgcolor="#bbffbb"
| February 17 || 1:00 pm ||  || at Belmont* ||  || E. S. Rose Park • Nashville, TN || W10–6 || Walker(1–0) || Marcotte(0–1) || Gilmore(1) || 168 || 3–0 || – || StatsStory
|- bgcolor="#ffbbbb"
| February 23 || 6:00 pm ||  || at * ||  || Bear Stadium • Conway, AR || L4–6 || Patton(1–0) || Bronke(0–1) || – || 295 || 3–1 || – || StatsStory
|- bgcolor="#bbffbb"
| February 24 || 1:00 pm ||  || at Central Arkansas* ||  || Bear Stadium • Conway, AR || W8–0 || Lindgren(2–0) || Callahan(0–2) || – || 282 || 4–1 || – || StatsStory
|- bgcolor="#ffbbbb"
| February 24 || 4:30 pm ||  || at Central Arkansas* ||  || Bear Stadium • Conway, AR || L1–4 || Moyer(1–0) || Walker(1–1) || Williams(1) || 282 || 4–2 || – || StatsStory
|- bgcolor="#bbffbb"
| February 25 || 12:00 pm ||  || at Central Arkansas* ||  || Bear Stadium • Conway, AR || W6–3 || Gilmore(2–0) || Patton(1–1) || – || 185 || 5–2 || – || StatsStory
|-

|- bgcolor="#bbffbb"
| March 1 || 1:00 pm ||  || at * ||  || Reagan Field • Murray, KY || W4–3 || Headrick(1–0) || McMurray(0–2) || Gilmore(2) || 64 || 6–2 || – || StatsStory
|- bgcolor="#ffbbbb"
| March 1 || 4:00 pm ||  || at Murray State* ||  || Reagan Field • Murray, KY || L4–5 || Hayes(1–0) || Bronke(0–2) || – || 74 || 6–3 || – || StatsStory
|- bgcolor="#bbffbb"
| March 2 || 1:00 pm ||  || at Murray State* ||  || Reagan Field • Murray, KY || W9–5 || Johnson(1–0) || Hayes(1–1) || Gilmore(3) || 123 || 7–3 || – || StatsStory
|- bgcolor="#ffbbbb"
| March 8 || 4:30 pm ||  || at #2 Vanderbilt* ||  || Hawkins Field • Nashville, TN || L4–10 || Fellows(3–0) || Headrick(1–1) || Brown(2) || 2,694 || 7–4 || – || StatsStory
|- bgcolor="#ffbbbb"
| March 10 || 12:00 pm ||  || at #2 Vanderbilt* ||  || Hawkins Field • Nashville, TN || L1–9 || Raby(3–0) || Lindgren(2–1) || Fisher(1) || 2,866 || 7–5 || – || StatsStory
|- bgcolor="#bbffbb"
| March 10 || 3:30 pm ||  || at #2 Vanderbilt* ||  || Hawkins Field • Nashville, TN || W7–3 || Johnson(2–0) || King(0–1) || Gilmore(4) ||  || 8–5 || – || StatsStory
|- bgcolor="#bbffbb"
| March 12 || 3:00 pm ||  || at * ||  || Capaha Field • Cape Girardeau, MO || W18–6 || Wicklund(1–0) || Spalt(0–1) || – || 211 || 9–5 || – || StatsStory
|- bgcolor="#bbffbb"
| March 13 || 4:00 pm ||  || at * ||  || Simmons Baseball Complex • Edwardsville, IL || W16–9 || Peplow(1–0) || Byrd(0–1) || – || 101 || 10–5 || – || StatsStory
|- bgcolor="#bbffbb"
| March 16 || 1:00 pm || ESPN3 || * ||  || Duffy Bass Field • Normal, IL || W7–2 || Johnson(3–0) || Kohn(2–3) || – ||  || 11–5 || – || StatsStory
|- bgcolor="#bbffbb"
| March 16 || 4:40 pm ||  || Central Michigan* ||  || Duffy Bass Field • Normal, IL || W5–4 || Anderson(1–0) || Miller(0–1) || Gilmore(5) || 196 || 12–5 || – || StatsStory
|- bgcolor="#ffbbbb"
| March 17 || 1:00 pm || ESPN3 || Central Michigan* ||  || Duffy Bass Field • Normal, IL || L2–11 || Hankins(3–0) || Walker(1–2) || – || 258 || 12–6 || – || StatsStory
|- bgcolor="#bbffbb"
| March 19 || 5:00 pm || ESPN+ || * ||  || Duffy Bass Field • Normal, IL || W4–0 || Wicklund(2–0) || Toikka(1–2) || – || 245 || 13–6 || – || StatsStory
|- bgcolor="#ffbbbb"
| March 22 || 4:00 pm ||  || at #23 * ||  || Illinois Field • Champaign, IL || L3–14 || Fisher(3–1) || Headrick(1–2) || – || 751 || 13–7 || – || StatsStory
|- bgcolor="#ffbbbb"
| March 23 || 1:00 pm ||  || at #23 Illinois* ||  || Illinois Field • Champaign, IL || L2–4 || Weber(1–0) || Lindgren(2–2) || Acton(8) || 1,573 || 13–8 || – || StatsStory
|- bgcolor="#ffbbbb"
| March 24 || 12:00 pm ||  || at #23 Illinois* ||  || Illinois Field • Champaign, IL || L1–12 || Lavender(1–1) || Walker(1–3) || – || 661 || 13–9 || – || StatsStory
|- bgcolor="#ffbbbb"
| March 26 || 6:00 pm || ESPN+ || * ||  || Duffy Bass Field • Normal, IL || L3–6 || McIntosh(3–0) || Wicklund(2–1) || Sommers(4) || 346 || 13–10 || – || StatsStory
|- bgcolor="#ffbbbb"
| March 30 || 2:00 pm ||  || at * ||  || TD Ameritrade Park • Omaha, NE || L3–17 || Ragan(4–1) || Headrick(1–3) || – || 1,137 || 13–11 || – || StatsStory
|- bgcolor="#ffbbbb"
| March 31 || 12:00 pm ||  || at Creighton* ||  || TD Ameritrade Park • Omaha, NE || L7–811 || Sakowski(2–0) || Gilmore(2–1) || – ||  || 13–12 || – || StatsStory
|- bgcolor="#ffbbbb"
| March 31 || 4:00 pm ||  || at Creighton* ||  || TD Ameritrade Park • Omaha, NE || L3–7 || Johnson(3–0) || Walker(1–4) || – ||  || 13–13 || – || StatsStory
|-

|- bgcolor="#bbffbb"
| April 2 || 5:00 pm || ESPN+ || * ||  || Duffy Bass Field • Normal, IL || W3–0 || Wicklund(3–1) || Wolfe(1–2) || – || 281 || 14–13 || – || StatsStory
|- bgcolor="#bbffbb"
| April 3 || 4:05 pm ||  || at * ||  || Duane Banks Field • Iowa City, IA || W11–6 || Vogrin(1–0) || Wallace(1–1) || – || 427 || 15–13 || – || StatsStory
|- bgcolor="#bbffbb"
| April 5 || 3:00 pm ||  || at  ||  || Emory G. Bauer Field • Valparaiso, IN || W13–1 || Headrick(2–3) || Tieman(1–5) || – || 159 || 16–13 || 1–0 || StatsStory
|- bgcolor="#bbffbb"
| April 6 || 1:00 pm ||  || at Valparaiso ||  || Emory G. Bauer Field • Valparaiso, IN || W12–6 || Lindgren(3–2) || Fields(2–3) || – ||  || 17–13 || 2–0 || StatsStory
|- bgcolor="#ffbbbb"
| April 6 || 3:30 pm ||  || at Valparaiso ||  || Emory G. Bauer Field • Valparaiso, IN || L2–4 || Hammel(1–3) || Walker(1–5) || Rhodehouse(2) || 213 || 17–14 || 2–1 || StatsStory
|- bgcolor="#bbffbb"
| April 9 || 5:00 pm || ESPN+ || Illinois* ||  || Duffy Bass Field • Normal, IL || W7–613 || Anderson(2–0) || Acton(1–2) || – || 989 || 18–14 || – || StatsStory
|- bgcolor="#bbffbb"
| April 12 || 5:00 pm || ESPN+ ||  ||  || Duffy Bass Field • Normal, IL || W7–1 || Headrick(3–3) || Lochner(2–1) || – || 404 || 19–14 || 3–1 || StatsStory
|- bgcolor="#bbffbb"
| April 13 || 1:00 pm ||  || Missouri State ||  || Duffy Bass Field • Normal, IL || W7–5 || Johnson(4–0) || Sechler(2–3) || – ||  || 20–14 || 4–1 || StatsStory
|- bgcolor="#bbffbb"
| April 13 || 4:30 pm ||  || Missouri State ||  || Duffy Bass Field • Normal, IL || W5–3 || Walker(2–5) || Schwab(1–4) || Gilmore(6) || 512 || 21–14 || 5–1 || StatsStory
|- bgcolor="#ffbbbb"
| April 16 || 6:00 pm ||  || at UIC*||  || Curtis Granderson Stadium • Chicago, IL || L1–6 || Toikka(2–2) || Wicklund(3–2) || – || 204 || 21–15 || – || StatsStory
|- bgcolor="#bbffbb"
| April 17 || 5:00 pm || ESPN+ || * ||  || Duffy Bass Field • Normal, IL || W2–1 || Vogrin(2–0) || Martizia(2–1) || Gilmore(7) || 571 || 22–15 || – || StatsStory
|- bgcolor="#bbffbb"
| April 19 || 6:30 pm ||  || at  ||  || Itchy Jones Stadium • Carbondale, IL || W7–4 || Headrick(4–3) || Hiser(3–2) || Gilmore(8) || 192 || 23–15 || 6–1 || StatsStory
|- bgcolor="#bbffbb"
| April 20 || 2:00 pm ||  || at Southern Illinois ||  || Itchy Jones Stadium • Carbondale, IL || W7–6 || Lindgren(4–2) || Givens(3–5) || Gilmore(9) || 466 || 24–15 || 7–1 || StatsStory
|- bgcolor="#bbffbb"
| April 21 || 1:00 pm ||  || at Southern Illinois ||  || Itchy Jones Stadium • Carbondale, IL || W8–4 || Walker(3–5) || Begner(3–5) || Johnson(1) || 246 || 25–15 || 8–1 || StatsStory
|- bgcolor="#bbffbb"
| April 23 || 5:00 pm || ESPN+ || * ||  || Duffy Bass Field • Normal, IL || W10–2 || Wicklund(4–3) || Walker(0–1) || – || 291 || 26–15 || – || StatsStory
|- bgcolor="#bbffbb"
| April 26 || 6:30 pm ||  || at Dallas Baptist ||  || Horner Ballpark • Dallas, TX || W9–8 || Headrick(5–3) || Martinson(5–3) || Gilmore(10) || 1,184 || 27–15 || 9–1 || StatsStory
|- bgcolor="#ffbbbb"
| April 27 || 2:00 pm ||  || at Dallas Baptist ||  || Horner Ballpark • Dallas, TX || L3–13 || Johnson(7–1) || Lindgren(4–3) || – || 1,000 || 27–16 || 9–2 || StatsStory
|- bgcolor="#ffbbbb"
| April 28 || 12:00 pm ||  || at Dallas Baptist ||  || Horner Ballpark • Dallas, TX || L4–11 || Bayless(6–1) || Walker(3–6) || – || 648 || 27–17 || 9–3 || StatsStory
|-

|- bgcolor="#ffbbbb"
| May 1 || 3:30 pm ||  || at * ||  || Rocky Miller Park • Evanston, IL || L3–6 || Paciorek(3–1) || Johnson(4–1) || Levy(1) || 167 || 27–18 || – || StatsStory
|- bgcolor="#bbffbb"
| May 3 || 5:00 pm || ESPN+ || Indiana State ||  || Duffy Bass Field • Normal, IL || W4–3 || Headrick(6–3) || Grauer(2–3) || – || 316 || 28–18 || 10–3 || StatsStory
|- bgcolor="#ffbbbb"
| May 4 || 2:00 pm || ESPN+ || Indiana State ||  || Duffy Bass Field • Normal, IL || L1–13 || Liberatore(9–0) || Lindgren(4–4) || – || 554 || 28–19 || 10–4 || StatsStory
|- bgcolor="#ffbbbb"
| May 5 || 1:00 pm || ESPN+ || Indiana State ||  || Duffy Bass Field • Normal, IL || L1–6 || Whitbread(6–1) || Walker(3–7) || Ward(5) || 368 || 28–20 || 10–5 || StatsStory
|- bgcolor="#bbffbb"
| May 10 || 6:00 pm ||  || at  ||  || Dozer Park • Peoria, IL || W1–0 || Headrick(7–3) || Janssen(4–2) || Johnson(2) || 398 || 29–20 || 11–5 || StatsStory
|- bgcolor="#bbffbb"
| May 11 || 6:00 pm ||  || at Bradley ||  || Dozer Park • Peoria, IL || W14–1 || Walker(4–7) || Olson(1–1) || – || 210 || 30–20 || 12–5 || StatsStory
|- bgcolor="#ffbbbb"
| May 12 || 1:00 pm ||  || at Bradley ||  || Dozer Park • Peoria, IL || L2–7 || Lund(5–3) || Wicklund(4–3) || – || 315 || 30–21 || 12–6 || StatsStory
|- bgcolor="#bbffbb"
| May 16 || 5:00 pm ||  ||  ||  || Duffy Bass Field • Normal, IL || W11–2 || Headrick(8–3) || Lukas(5–5) || – || 305 || 31–21 || 13–6 || StatsStory
|- bgcolor="#ffbbbb"
| May 17 || 5:00 pm || ESPN+ || Evansville ||  || Duffy Bass Field • Normal, IL || L8–11 || Hayden(3–2) || Walker(4–8) || Allinger(6) || 382 || 31–22 || 13–7 || StatsStory
|- bgcolor="#bbffbb"
| May 18 || 12:00 pm || ESPN+ || Evansville ||  || Duffy Bass Field • Normal, IL || W11–4 || Lindgren(5–4) || Weigand(2–6) || – || 357 || 32–22 || 14–7 || StatsStory
|-

|-
! style=";color:white;" | Postseason (4–4)
|- valign="top" 

|- bgcolor="#bbffbb"
| May 22 || 3:00 pm || ESPN+ || (8) Southern Illinois || (2) || Duffy Bass Field • Normal, IL || W4–1 || Headrick(9–3) || Hiser(4–4) || Johnson(3) ||  || 33–22 || – || StatsStory
|- bgcolor="#bbffbb"
| May 23 || 7:00 pm || ESPN+ || (3) Indiana State || (2) || Duffy Bass Field • Normal, IL || W10–7 || Anderson(3–0) || Ward(5–3) || Gilmore(11) || 694 || 34–22 || – || StatsStory
|- bgcolor="#ffbbbb"
| May 24 || 3:00 pm || ESPN+ || (1) Dallas Baptist || (2) || Duffy Bass Field • Normal, IL || L7–9 || Fouse(5–0) || Vogrin(2–1) || Carraway(4) ||  || 34–23 || – || StatsStory
|- bgcolor="#ffbbbb"
| May 24 || 9:00 pm || ESPN+ || (3) Indiana State || (2) || Duffy Bass Field • Normal, IL || L6–10 || Ward(6–3) || Wicklund(4–4) || – ||  || 34–24 || – || StatsStory
|-

|- bgcolor="#bbffbb"
| May 31 || 1:00 pm || ESPN3 || (2) Indiana || (3) || Jim Patterson Stadium • Louisville, KY || W8–7 || Harvey(1–0) || Manous(1–1) || – || 1,227 || 35–24 || – || StatsStory
|- bgcolor="#bbffbb"
| June 1 || 3:00 pm || ESPN3 || at (1) Louisville || (3) || Jim Patterson Stadium • Louisville, KY || W4–2 || Walker(5–8) || Detmers(11–4) || – || 2,843 || 36–24 || – || StatsStory
|- bgcolor="#ffbbbb"
| June 2 || 5:00 pm || ESPN3 || at (1) Louisville || (3) || Jim Patterson Stadium • Louisville, KY || L2–11 || Smith(6–0) || Lindgren(5–5) || – || 2,345 || 36–25 || – || StatsStory
|- bgcolor="#ffbbbb"
| June 3 || 12:00 pm || ESPN2 || at (1) Louisville || (3) || Jim Patterson Stadium • Louisville, KY || L3–4 || Kirian(3–1) || Gilmore(2–2) || – || 2,878 || 36–26 || – || StatsStory
|-

| Legend:       = Win       = Loss      Bold = Illinois State team member
|-
|"#" represents ranking. All rankings from Collegiate Baseball on the date of the contest."()" represents postseason seeding in the MVC Tournament or NCAA Regional, respectively.

References

Illinois State Redbirds
Illinois State Redbirds baseball
Illinois State Redbirds baseball seasons
Illinois State